MPYS may refer to:

 Manatee Palms Youth Services, a psychiatric hospital in Bradenton, Florida
 Stimulator of interferon genes, a protein that in humans is encoded by the TMEM173 gene